Jiří Novák and Radek Štěpánek were the defending champions, but Štěpánek did not compete this year. Novák teamed up with Petr Pála and lost in the first round to František Čermák and Leoš Friedl.

José Acasuso and Sebastián Prieto won the title by defeating Mariano Hood and Tommy Robredo 7–6(7–4), 6–3 in the final.

Seeds

Draw

Draw

References

External links
 Official results archive (ATP)
 Official results archive (ITF)

Doubles 2005
Stuttgart Doubles
2005 in German tennis